Lasannah V. "Lasan" Kromah (born June 24, 1991) is an American professional basketball player for Fuenlabrada of the Liga ACB. He played college basketball for George Washington University and Connecticut.

High school career
Kromah attended Eleanor Roosevelt High School in Greenbelt, Maryland. As a senior, he averaged 21 points, 9 rebounds, and 2 steals per game under coach Brendan O'Connell, going on to be named first team All-County by the Prince George's Gazette and All-Met fourth team by the Washington Post.

College career
Kromah was recruited by Karl Hobbs to George Washington University after a stellar high school career. He was named to the Atlantic-10 all rookie team after averaging 11.8 points per game during his freshman season at GW. Heading into his sophomore season, Kromah was a Preseason Atlantic 10 Third Team All-Conference Selection. However, after suffering a left foot injury during a preseason scrimmage, Kromah was forced to sit out the entire 2010–11 season. As a junior in 2011–12, he averaged 11.1 points, 5.1 rebounds, 2.5 assists, 1.7 steals and 29.4 minutes in 31 games. He led George Washington and ranked seventh in the A-10 in steals (52), second on team in scoring (345), assists (79), rebounds (159) and blocks (18). As a senior in 2012–13, Kromah played in all 30 games with 11 starts. He was second on the team with 10.1 points in 24.5 minutes per game. He finished his George Washington career with over 1,000 points, the 44th player in program history to accomplish that feat.

Kromah later reunited with Hobbs, who became an assistant at UConn, and joined the Huskies as a graduate student with one season of eligibility remaining after playing three years and earning a degree in Criminal Justice from George Washington University. In 2013–14, he appeared in all 40 games for the Huskies, starting 17, while averaging 6.1 points and 2.7 rebounds per game. The Huskies went on to win 2014 NCAA championship.

Professional career
After going undrafted in the 2014 NBA draft, Kromah joined the Brooklyn Nets for the 2014 NBA Summer League. On August 11, 2014, he signed with Alba Fehérvár of Hungary for the 2014–15 season.

On June 29, 2015, Kromah signed with Torku Konyaspor of the Turkish Basketball League. He left Konyaspor in December 2015, and the following month, he signed with Greek team Kavala.

On October 30, 2016, Kromah was selected by the Westchester Knicks in the third round of the 2016 NBA Development League draft. He joined the team for the 2016–17 season, but was waived on November 18, 2016 after appearing in two games. Later that month, he returned to Greece and signed with Promitheas Patras. He appeared in two games for Promitheas before leaving the team in late December. On January 13, 2017, he signed with Melbourne United for the rest of the 2016–17 NBL season as an injury replacement for Ramone Moore.

On August 12, 2019, Kromah returned to Greece and signed with Kolossos Rodou. He averaged 15.7 points, 3.9 rebounds and 2.2 assists per game. On August 4, 2020, Kromah signed with Cholet Basket of the LNB Pro A. He was named player of the week on October 2, after posting 22 points and six assists against Élan Chalon.

On August 10, 2021, he has signed with Fos Provence Basket of the LNB Pro A.

On August 17, 2022, he has signed with Fuenlabrada of the Liga ACB.

Personal life
Kromah is the son of Al and Shewvan Kromah, and has an older brother, Adam, and an older sister, Manyuan.

References

External links
UConn Huskies bio
George Washington Colonials bio

1991 births
Living people
Alba Fehérvár players
American expatriate basketball people in Australia
American expatriate basketball people in France
American expatriate basketball people in Greece
American expatriate basketball people in Hungary
American expatriate basketball people in Romania
American expatriate basketball people in Turkey
American men's basketball players
Baloncesto Fuenlabrada players
Basketball players from New York City
BC Körmend players
CS Universitatea Cluj-Napoca (men's basketball) players
Fos Provence Basket players
George Washington Colonials men's basketball players
Kavala B.C. players
Kolossos Rodou B.C. players
Promitheas Patras B.C. players
Melbourne United players
Shooting guards
Small forwards
Sportspeople from Queens, New York
Torku Konyaspor B.K. players
UConn Huskies men's basketball players
Westchester Knicks players